The discography of South Korean singer Lee Hi consists of four studio albums, one extended play, and nine singles.

Lee Hi was the runner-up of SBS' K-pop Star Season 1. Her debut single "1.2.3.4", was released on October 28, 2012, and reached No. 1 with first-week sales of 667,549 downloads. On March 28, 2013, Lee Hi released her first album, which sold 17,309 copies and total 5,488,390 digital singles. Near the end of 2013, Lee Hi released a collaboration with Park Bom of 2NE1, a cover of Mariah Carey's single "All I Want for Christmas Is You". In 2014 she made a unit with Akdong Musician's Lee Suhyun and released "I'm Different", featuring Bobby of iKon. After three years from her first album, Lee Hi released a half album titled Seoulite digitally on March 9, 2016, including five songs. The full album Seoulite was released on April 20 and has 11 songs.

Lee Hi's third Korean studio album 4 Only was released on September 9, 2021.

Albums

Studio albums

Extended plays

Singles

As a lead artist

As a featured artist

Collaborations

Other charted songs

Soundtrack appearances

Notes

References

Discographies of South Korean artists